Rearguard Falls is located in Rearguard Falls Provincial Park on the Fraser River in British Columbia.
A boardwalk is installed on the trail leading from the rest area on Yellowhead Highway to the falls; allowing travellers a close-up view of the falls.

See also
List of waterfalls of British Columbia
Overlander Falls, another waterfall on the Fraser just upstream from Rearguard Falls.

References

Waterfalls of British Columbia
Cariboo Land District